Canalejas is a locality located in the municipality of Almanza, in León province, Castile and León, Spain. As of 2020, it has a population of 59.

Geography 
Canalejas is located 64km east of León, Spain.

References

Populated places in the Province of León